Cesar Garcia (born August 4, 2002) is an American professional soccer player who plays as a midfielder for North Texas SC in USL League One.

References

External links
 
 Cesar Garcia at FC Dallas

2002 births
Living people
American soccer players
Association football midfielders
North Texas SC players
Soccer players from Dallas
USL League One players